Patriotic Front may refer to:

Patriotic Front (Austria)
Patriotic Front (Bulgaria)
Patriotic Front (Cyprus)
Patriotic Front (Trinidad and Tobago)
Patriotic Front (Zambia)
Patriotic Front (Zimbabwe)
Zimbabwe African National Union - Patriotic Front
Patriotic Front for Political Action (UK)
Rwandese Patriotic Front
Manuel Rodríguez Patriotic Front, a Marxist-Leninist paramilitary organization in Chile